Noddy's Toyland Adventures is a British children's television programme produced by Cosgrove Hall Films from September 1992 until April 1994 and December 1994 (and reran in 2000 on the Children's BBC block of the BBC). The show stars the voices of Susan Sheridan and Jimmy Hibbert. Each episode was written by Julia and Chris Allen respectively during its broadcast run. Paul K. Joyce composed and performed the show's opening theme.

In North America, episodes were broadcast as part of a full thirty-minute program titled Noddy. The program featured the original UK animations re-dubbed with North American voices (broadcast in between all new live action segments), while Paul K. Joyce's soundtrack was replaced by a new score by Stacey Hersh, who also scored the live action part of the series. Nashville-based songwriter Dennis Scott composed 99 new songs for the live action segments, including the show's opening theme.

Universal released several of the re-dubbed Noddy animations on VHS (through USA Home Entertainment and PolyGram Video). These videos also featured songs written by Stacey Hersh and co-writer Ari Posner. This new series aired in the UK in 1999, under the title Noddy in Toyland (unrelated to the 2009 series of the same name); the original British soundtrack was used - however the live action segments were unaltered for original cut.

Premise 
The show follows the adventures of Noddy, a little wooden doll who lives in Toyland with his red and yellow car, often trying to make sixpence or getting himself in trouble. Along with his best friends (Big Ears, Mr. Plod and Tessie Bear), they are always ready to lend a hand, especially when he gets tricked by Gobbo and Sly, the wicked Goblins. Each episode mostly ends with Noddy laughing and nodding his head (likely ringing the bell on his hat in the end).

Characters

Main
Noddy is the protagonist of the series. Noddy is an imaginative young wooden boy who lives in Toyland. Voiced by Susan Sheridan in the United Kingdom dub, and Catherine Disher in the American/Canadian dub.
 Tessie Bear, a neutral and clever young female teddy bear, who is happy trying new things and is Noddy's girlfriend. Tessie was voiced by Susan Sheridan in the United Kingdom dub, and Karen Bernstein in the American/Canadian dub.
Big Ears is a wise, bearded male gnome who lives in a toadstool house in Toadstool Woods. He serves as a father figure to Noddy, and is the one Noddy usually goes to for advice and support. If Noddy has problems, Big Ears is always happy to help with his astute knowledge and sense-of-humour. He was voiced by Jimmy Hibbert in the United Kingdom dub, and Benedict Campbell in the American/Canadian dub.
Dinah Doll, a kind female china doll, who sells all kinds of everything in the market. Dinah plays an older sibling figure role to both Noddy and Tessie, and the three are always ready to help each other out when a problem  arises. Dinah was voiced by Susan Sheridan in the United Kingdom dub, and Sharon Lee Williams in the American/Canadian dub.
Mr. Plod is the Toytown policeman. Mr. Plod is quite committed to upholding the law, and thinks Toytown can't live without him. Mr. Plod has a British accent in both the United Kingdom and United States dubbed versions, but in the United Kingdom version, Mr. Plod speaks with a West Country accent. Mr. Plod was voiced by Jimmy Hibbert in the United Kingdom dub, and Benedict Campbell in the American/Canadian dub. He uses the following catchphrase: "Stop, in the name of the law".
 Bumpy Dog is Noddy's constant companion and Tessie's pet dog. Bumpy is highly excitable and will rush at friends, but is loyal, and has sensitive feelings if scolded by Noddy or anyone else. Bumpy's vocal effects were performed by Jimmy Hibbert in both the United Kingdom and American/Canadian dubs.
 Sly and Gobbo are the main antagonists of the series. They are goblins who are very mischievous and greedy, and always play horrible tricks on Noddy. Ironically, Gobbo is the more conniving and intelligent one. They were voiced by Susan Sheridan (Sly) and Jimmy Hibbert (Gobbo) in the United Kingdom dub, and Catherine Disher (Sly) and James Rankin (Gobbo) in the American/Canadian dub, and in this dub Sly is portrayed as a female character.
 Noddy's Car is the yellow car with red decals which Noddy drives; it parps its horn and sways on its chassis to indicate emotion. Yellow Car is voiced by Jimmy Hibbert in both the United Kingdom and American/Canadian dubs.

Recurring
Mr. Wobbly Man is a male roly-poly toy who is very dilligent about things. Mr. Wobbly Man was voiced by Jimmy Hibbert in the United Kingdom dub, and Michael Stark in the American dub.
 Master Tubby Bear is Mr. and Mrs. Tubby Bear's son who is sometimes naughty and mischievous. As a mummy's boy sort of character, Master Tubby gets easily jealous whenever Noddy receives more attention from his parents than him. Master Tubby was voiced by Jimmy Hibbert in the United Kingdom dub, and Catherine Disher in the American/Canadian dub.
 Clockwork Mouse is a toy mouse who often requires winding up. Clockwork is perky and often gets into scrapes as a result from Noddy's misadventures, but the two are generally good friends. Clockwork was voiced by Susan Sheridan in the United Kingdom dub, and Michael Stark in the American/Canadian dub.
 Mr. Sparks is Toyland's handyman with a Scottish accent, who has a street-smart personality and can mend anything. Mr. Sparks was voiced by Jimmy Hibbert in the United Kingdom dub, and Michael Stark in the American/Canadian dub.
 Miss Pink Cat is a French/Southern 'young adult' female cat who is fussy and neat and has no patience for foolishness, even her own. Pink Cat was voiced by Susan Sheridan in the United Kingdom dub, and Lynne Griffin in the American/Canadian dub.
 Mr. Jumbo is a mild-mannered male elephant who is friends with Clockwork Mouse. Jumbo was voiced by Jimmy Hibbert in the United Kingdom dub, and Michael Stark in the American/Canadian dub.
 The Skittles are a family of three bowling pins consisting of Mrs. Sally Skittle and her many children of various sizes. They like being knocked down.
 Martha Monkey is a mischievous tomboy monkey who is very silly and bossy and is always making rude remarks. She has a similar older sibling figure position to Noddy with Dinah Doll, but is considerably more careless. Martha was voiced by Susan Sheridan in the United Kingdom dub, and Lynne Griffin in the American/Canadian dub.
 Clockwork Clown is an Italian toy clown who does amazing tricks. Clockwork Clown was voiced by Jimmy Hibbert in the United Kingdom dub, and Benedict Campbell in the American/Canadian dub.
 Mr. Train Driver is a train driver who drives the Toyland Express train. Train Driver was voiced by Jimmy Hibbert in the United Kingdom dub, and Michael Stark in the American/Canadian dub.

Minor
 Mr. Tubby Bear is Noddy's next door neighbour. His first name is John. John was voiced by Jimmy Hibbert in the United Kingdom dub, and Benedict Campbell in the American/Canadian dub.
 Mrs. Tubby Bear is Noddy's next door neighbour. Her first name is Fiona. It is clear that she, like Mr Tubby Bear, are the superiors of Noddy, as John always refers to them as "Mr. and Mrs. Tubby Bear" and they regard Noddy like another son, helping Noddy grow in confidence. Fiona was voiced by Susan Sheridan and Fiona Reid in the American/Canadian dub.
 Mr. Milko is Toyland's local milkman. Milko sometimes can be gloomy and sad, but Noddy's bell on his hat always cheers him up. Milko was voiced by Jimmy Hibbert in the United Kingdom dub, and Michael Stark in the American/Canadian dub.
 Sammy Sailor is the local Scottish harbour sailor. Sammy Sailor was voiced by Jimmy Hibbert in the United Kingdom dub, and Michael Stark in the American/Canadian dub.
 Bert Monkey is a youngish monkey with a tail that is very naughty and has a mind of its own, often stealing objects all by itself. Bert was voiced by Jimmy Hibbert. While it's heavily implied that this character is the same character as Bunkey, this is never confirmed within the series.
 Mr. Noah lives on the ark with Mrs. Noah and the animals, obviously based on the bible story. Mr. Noah was voiced by Jimmy Hibbert in the United Kingdom dub, and Michael Stark in the American dub.
 Mrs. Noah lives on the ark with Mr. Noah and the animals. Mrs. Noah was voiced by Susan Sheridan in the United Kingdom dub, and Fiona Reid in the American/Canadian dub.
 Mr. Straw lives on the farm with Mrs. Straw and the farm animals. Mr. Straw was voiced by Jimmy Hibbert in the United Kingdom dub, and Michael Stark in the American/Canadian dub.
 Mrs. Straw lives on the farm with Mr. Straw and the farm animals. Mrs. Straw was voiced by Susan Sheridan in the United Kingdom dub.
 Lord Giraffe lives on the ark with Mr. and Mrs. Noah and the other animals. Lord Giraffe was voiced by Jimmy Hibbert in both the United Kingdom and American/Canadian dubs.
 Lady Giraffe lives on the ark with Mr. and Mrs. Noah and the other animals. Lady Giraffe was voiced by Susan Sheridan in both the United Kingdom and American/Canadian dubs.

Episodes
Please note; only a few episodes had their titles Americanised. This was for a US video release. The rest were left unchanged.

Series 1 (1992)

Series 2 (1993)

Series 3 (3 and 4 in US) (1994)
It should be noted in US Releases of Series 3 was split into The 3rd and 4th Season, And Series 4 was Released As Season 5 in The US.

Christmas Special (1994)

Series 4 (5 in US) (2000)

Series 1 and 4 episodes share the title "Noddy and the Goblins": the former opens with "It had been a busy day in Toyland", while the latter opens with "It was a quiet morning in Toyland".

VHS releases in the United Kingdom

VHS releases in the United States
In the US, a few VHS Tapes were released using the US Dub from Noddy, and two exclusive songs.

DVD release in the United Kingdom
, only one official DVD was released: a 1999 release of Noddy in Toyland with three episodes ("Noddy Lends A Hand", "Noddy Meets Some Silly Hens" and "Noddy and His Unhappy Car").

Home media 
In 2020, the series began streaming on NBCUniversal's Peacock and Apple TV.

References

External links

 
 The Unofficial Noddy site
 

BBC children's television shows
Australian Broadcasting Corporation original programming
British children's animated adventure television series
British children's animated comedy television series
British stop-motion animated television series
British television shows based on children's books
1992 British television series debuts
2000 British television series endings
1990s British animated television series
2000s British animated television series
English-language television shows
Adaptations of works by Enid Blyton
Television series by Universal Television
DreamWorks Classics
Television series by Cosgrove Hall Films
Sentient toys in fiction
CBeebies